Governor Brandon may refer to:

Gerard Brandon (1788–1850), 4th and 6th Governor of Mississippi
William W. Brandon (1868–1934), 37th Governor of Alabama